No. 161 (Bomber Reconnaissance) Squadron was a Royal Canadian Air Force squadron that was active during the Second World War.  It was primarily deployed in an anti-submarine role and was based at Dartmouth, Nova Scotia. The squadron flew the Digby and Canso before disbanding on 31 May 1945.

References

See also
 RCAF Eastern Air Command

Royal Canadian Air Force squadrons (disbanded)
Military units and formations of Canada in World War II